Memphis Blues is the tenth studio album by American singer Cyndi Lauper, containing cover versions of classic blues songs. Regarded as a continuation of her 2008 comeback, the album was a nominee for the Grammy Awards 2010 and was released on her 57th birthday, June 22, 2010. According to the Brazilian daily newspaper O Globo, the album had sold 600,000 copies worldwide by November 2010. Memphis Blues was voted the 7th best album of 2010 by the New York Post, and it went on to become Billboard's biggest selling blues album of 2010. To support the album, Lauper made her biggest tour ever, the Memphis Blues Tour, which had more than 140 shows.

Background
Lauper announced via her official Twitter account in December 2009 that she would be recording a blues album. Sessions were held in March 2010 at Electraphonic Studios in Memphis, Tennessee, with producer Scott Bomar, her frequent collaborator Bill Wittman, and special guests B. B. King, Charlie Musselwhite, Ann Peebles and Allen Toussaint.

Promotion
Lauper performed songs from the album on the Late Show with David Letterman on June 14, on The Joy Behar Show on June 21, The Howard Stern Show and The Ellen DeGeneres Show on June 22, Good Morning America on June 23 and Live with Regis and Kelly on June 24, on The Early Show on July 20. and on The Tonight Show with Jay Leno on August 30.

Lauper has supported the album with the Memphis Blues Tour.

Lauper was honored at the 2010 NARM Awards and performed several songs from the Memphis Blues album at the event.

Commercial reception
Memphis Blues debuted at number one on the U.S. Billboard Top Blues chart and at number 26 on the official Billboard 200, with a moderately successful first week sales of more than 16,000 copies. The album is Lauper's third-highest charting album on the Billboard 200 of her career, trailing only her first two releases, She's So Unusual and True Colors. The album remained at No. 1 on the Billboard Blues chart for thirteen weeks, totaling 40 weeks in the chart. The album has sold 76,000 copies in the United States as of May 2016. In 2011 it was awarded a double silver certification from the Independent Music Companies Association which indicated sales of at least 40,000 copies throughout Europe. In Brazil, the album sold around 10,000 units.

Seven songs from the album ranked in the Top 25 on Billboard's Blues Digital Songs chart, including "Crossroads" at number one.

Track listing

Personnel
Cyndi Lauper – lead vocals, production
Charles "Skip" Pitts - guitar
Lester Snell – guitar
Charlie Musselwhite - harmonica
Allen Toussaint – keyboards
William Wittman - bass, engineer
Leroy Hodges – bass
Howard Grimes – drums
Marc Franklin – trumpet
Derrick Williams – tenor saxophone
Kirk Smothers – baritone saxophone
B.B. King – vocals and guitar on "Early in the Mornin"
Jonny Lang – vocals and guitar on "How Blue Can You Get" and "Crossroads"
Ann Peebles – vocals on "Rollin' and Tumblin"
Scott Bomar – production

Charts

Weekly charts

Year-end chart

Songs

Accolades

|-
| style="text-align:center;"| 2011 || Memphis Blues  || Best Traditional Blues Album || 
|-

References

Cyndi Lauper albums
2010 albums
Blues albums by American artists